Thomas Coveney, D.Med. was an Oxford college head in the 16th century.

Coveney was educated at Magdalen College, Oxford, where he trained as a physician. He was admitted to practice on 28 March 1555. He was president of Magdalen College, Oxford, from 1558 until being deprived in 1561 for not being in holy orders.

References

Year of birth unknown
Year of death unknown
Presidents of Magdalen College, Oxford
16th-century English medical doctors